Chew Chew Baby is a Paramount/Harveytoon animated short in the Noveltoon series made by Paramount Cartoon Studios for release on August 15, 1958. It was directed by Isadore Sparber from a story by Irving Spector. Jackson Beck and Jack Mercer provide uncredited voices. 

Cannibalism is the theme of this film, in which seven characters are attacked (six get swallowed) by a pygmy after he tracks a tourist to Cincinnati.

This film shows a strong Tex Avery influence, and copies Avery's blood transfusion gag from Crazy Mixed-Up Pup.

Reception
Motion Picture Exhibitor (October 1, 1958): "Featuring modernistic drawings, this concerns an American hunter in Africa who tangles with a small native who comes to America and turns out to be a purple people eater. The cannibal finds the loud-mouthed hunter. There is an accident. The hunter is given a blood transfusion from the cannibal, and this makes him a people eater, too. Fair."

References

External links 
 
 

1950s American animated films
1950s animated short films
1958 animated films
1958 short films
American animated short films
Films about cannibalism
Films about race and ethnicity
Films directed by Isadore Sparber
Paramount Pictures short films
1950s English-language films
Films set in Cincinnati